Paul Anthony Ginsborg (18 July 1945 – 11 May 2022) was a British historian. In the 1980s, he was Professor at the University of Siena; from 1992, he was Professor of Contemporary European History at the University of Florence.

Education and activism
Ginsborg was educated at St Paul's School, London, and Queens' College, Cambridge, where he graduated with a BA degree in History in 1966. He was a Fellow of Churchill College, Cambridge.

With Pancho Pardi, he opposed Berlusconi's justice "reforms", campaigning alongside the girotondi movement.

Law on Holocaust denial
Ginsborg was of Jewish parentage. Along with Carlo Ginzburg, Marcello Flores, Sergio Luzzatto, Claudio Pavone, Enzo Traverso, et al., he signed a call in January 2002 against a law project, presented by Justice Minister Clemente Mastella, to specifically penalize Holocaust denial. They argued that Italy's legislation was sufficient to cope with such acts. The amended law project finally restricted itself to reinforcing sentences concerning hate speech.

Publications
Daniele Manin e la rivoluzione veneziana del 1848-49, Milano, Feltrinelli, 1978; Torino, Einaudi, 2007. .
Storia d'Italia dal dopoguerra a oggi. Società e politica 1943-1988, 2 voll., Torino, Einaudi, 1989. ; Milano, Einaudi scuola, 1996. .(In English: A History of Contemporary Italy: Society and Politics, 1943–1988, Macmillan 2003).
Dialogo su Berlinguer, con Massimo D'Alema, Firenze, Giunti, 1994. .
Stato dell'Italia, a cura di, Milano, Il saggiatore-B. Mondadori, 1994. .
Le virtù della Repubblica. Conversazione a Formia, a cura di, Milano, Il saggiatore, 1994. .
Enti locali, società civile e famiglia nell'educazione in Toscana, a cura di e con Dario Ragazzini e Gastone Tassinari, Firenze, Edizioni Regione Toscana, 1996.
L'Italia del tempo presente. Famiglia, società civile, Stato 1980-1996, Torino, Einaudi, 1998. .
Storia d'Italia 1943-1996. Famiglia, società, Stato, Torino, Einaudi, 1998. .
Un'Italia minore. Famiglia, istruzione e tradizioni civiche in Valdelsa, a cura di e con Francesco Ramella, Firenze, Giunti, 1999. .
Italy and its Discontents 1980-2001, Penguin, 2001.
Berlusconi. Ambizioni patrimoniali in una democrazia mediatica, Torino, Einaudi, 2003. .
Il tempo di cambiare. Politica e potere della vita quotidiana, Torino, Einaudi, 2004. .
La democrazia che non c'è, Torino, Einaudi, 2006. .
Storia d'Italia. Annali, XXII, Il Risorgimento, a cura di e con Alberto Mario Banti, Torino, Einaudi, 2007. .
Salviamo l'Italia, Torino, Einaudi, 2010. .
Berlusconismo. Analisi di un sistema di potere, a cura di e con Enrica Asquer, Roma-Bari, Laterza, 2011. .
Passions and Politics, with Sergio Labate ( Polity, 2019).

References

External links 
 Contributor page at London Review of Books

1945 births
2022 deaths
British Jews
British historians
Jewish historians
Academic staff of the University of Florence
Alumni of Queens' College, Cambridge
Fellows of Churchill College, Cambridge